"Headboard" is the second single by American rapper Hurricane Chris from his second studio album, Unleashed. The song was produced by The Inkredibles. The song features a guest appearances from Mario and Plies.

Music video
The music video was released on October 16, 2009.

Charts

References

2009 singles
2009 songs
Hurricane Chris (rapper) songs
Mario (singer) songs
Plies (rapper) songs
Dirty rap songs
Songs written by Kevin Cossom
Songs written by Plies (rapper)
Song recordings produced by the Inkredibles